Profanation (Preparation for a Coming Darkness) is the last album by Praxis, released in Japan on January 1, 2008. The album features guest appearances by Iggy Pop, Mike Patton, Serj Tankian and Killah Priest among others; notably it features some of the last known recordings of hip-hop emcee & gothic-futurist visual artist Rammellzee. The album had a US release via M.O.D. Technologies in 2011.

For more than a year the album was only available for purchase by ordering it from Japan. Japanese website "Neowing" released samples of each song. On February 3, 2009 it was available as a download.

A US version was released on January 25, 2011, through Bill Laswell's new label, M.O.D. Technologies. The re-release features two new live tracks "Wedge" and "Subgrid". Not long after this re-release, Laswell commented on the likely end of the band and that he considered the band as a "closed chapter". M.O.D. Technologies also slated (through their distributor Redeye Distribution) a vinyl version for April 2013.

Track listing

US release (bonus tracks)

Personnel

By song

General credits
Produced and arranged by Bill Laswell
Created at Orange Music Orange, NJ
Engineer: Robert Musso
Assistant: James Dellatacoma
Drums and Amps/Set up: Artie Smith
Mastered at Turtle Tone Studio
Engineer: Michael Fossenkemper
Front + Back panels: James Koehnline
Design: John Brown @ cloud chamber

References

External links
 Profanation CD sale

2008 albums
Praxis (band) albums
Albums produced by Bill Laswell